Richard Alan Schroeder (born October 29, 1961) is an American former competition swimmer who was a breaststroke specialist and two-time Olympic gold medalist.

Schroeder represented the United States at the 1984 Summer Olympics in Los Angeles, California.  He earned a gold medal by swimming the breaststroke leg for the winning U.S. team in the preliminary heats of the men's 4×100-meter medley relay.  At the 1984 Olympics, he also competed in the men's 200-meter breaststroke, finishing fourth in the final with a time of 2:18.03.

He also represented the United States at the 1988 Summer Olympics in Seoul, South Korea.  He won a gold medal swimming the breaststroke leg in the final of the men's 4×100-meter medley relay for the winning U.S. team.  He also finished sixth in the final of the men's 100-meter breaststroke event with a time of 1:02.55.

See also
 List of Olympic medalists in swimming (men)

References

1961 births
Living people
American male breaststroke swimmers
Olympic gold medalists for the United States in swimming
Swimmers at the 1984 Summer Olympics
Swimmers at the 1988 Summer Olympics
UC Santa Barbara Gauchos men's swimmers
Place of birth missing (living people)
Medalists at the 1988 Summer Olympics
Medalists at the 1984 Summer Olympics